Şıhlar, Alanya is a village in the District of Alanya, Antalya Province, Turkey.

References

Villages in Alanya District